The 1840 United States presidential election in Maine took place between October 30 and December 2, 1840, as part of the 1840 United States presidential election. Voters chose ten representatives, or electors to the Electoral College, who voted for president and vice president.

Maine voted for the Whig candidate, William Henry Harrison, over Democratic candidate Martin Van Buren. Harrison won the state by a very narrow margin of 0.46%.

Maine was typically a Democratic state during the Second Party System, however, with Harrison narrowly winning the state, this would be the only time that a Whig presidential candidate would win Maine.

Results

See also
 United States presidential elections in Maine

References

Maine
1840
1840 Maine elections